Moustapha Zeghba (born 21 November 1990) is an Algerian professional footballer who plays as a goalkeeper for Saudi Professional League club Damac and the Algeria national team.

International career
Zeghba represented Algeria at the 2021 FIFA Arab Cup, debuting in a 2–0 win in the tournament against Lebanon on 4 December 2021.

Honours
Algeria
FIFA Arab Cup: 2021

Individual
 Saudi Professional League Goalkeeper of the Month: September 2021

References

External links
 
 

1990 births
Living people
Association football goalkeepers
Algerian footballers
Algeria international footballers
Algerian expatriate footballers
Algerian Ligue Professionnelle 1 players
Saudi Professional League players
USM El Harrach players
ES Sétif players
Amal Bou Saâda players
People from M'Sila
MC El Eulma players
WR M'Sila players
Al-Wehda Club (Mecca) players
Damac FC players
Expatriate footballers in Saudi Arabia
Algerian expatriate sportspeople in Saudi Arabia
21st-century Algerian people